Peggy Ann Wood (14 June 1912 – 30 May 1998) was a British actress, director and theatre manager associated heavily with the Bristol Old Vic.  In partnership with her husband, Ronald Russell (1910–1994), she ran the repertory company the Rapier Players, based in Bristol's Colston Hall. During the Second World War, Peggy Ann Wood ran the theatre whilst Ronnie served in the Police War Reserves, and once the Prince's Theatre had been bombed in November 1940, the Rapier Players provided the only live theatre in the city of Bristol. The contribution of Ronnie Russell and Peggy Ann Wood to the theatrical heritage of Bristol was commemorated with a Blue Plaque Ceremony in July 2002, which is situated on the outside of Colston Hall, Bristol.

Personal life and death
Wood was born in 1912, in Chiswick, daughter of the composer and conductor Arthur Wood. She studied at St Paul's School. In 1931, while performing in repertory at Rochester, she met her future husband Russell.  They married in 1937 and remained together for 57 years, until his death in 1994. Wood died four years later at age 85.

Partial filmography
 All Creatures Great and Small as Mrs Beck
 The Assam Garden as Mrs Grace
 After Henry as Vera Poling

References

External links

1912 births
1998 deaths
20th-century English actresses
English theatre directors
Women theatre directors
People from Chiswick